Indiantown is an unincorporated community in Menominee County, in the U.S. state of Michigan.

History
The community was named from the fact the town site had contained an Indian settlement before the railroad station was built.

References

Unincorporated communities in Menominee County, Michigan